Canyonleigh (formerly known as Canyan Leigh) is a locality in the Southern Highlands of New South Wales, Australia, in Wingecarribee Shire. Canyan Leigh was named by Mrs Jane Murray who took up a property between Paddys River and Long Swamp. The property overlooked the valley and this gave Mrs Murray the idea 'Canyan' or 'Canyon' being the name for a steep sided gully.

Population
According to the 2021 census, there were 455 people living at Canyonleigh.

References 

Towns of the Southern Highlands (New South Wales)